The second season of Faking It, an American single-camera romantic comedy, premiered on September 23, 2014, and concluded on November 2, 2015, on the MTV network. In June 2014, the series was renewed for a second season of 10 episodes, which was later expanded to 20 episodes.

Plot

Part 1
In the aftermath of the first-season finale, the gang has to deal with the consequences of their choices. Karma (Katie Stevens) finds out Amy (Rita Volk) and Liam (Gregg Sulkin) slept together and starts having trust issues with both of them. Lauren (Bailey De Young) has her secret about being intersex exposed. Shane (Michael Willett) finds himself a new boyfriend—Duke (Skyler Maxon)—and Amy tries to figure out her sexuality while she tries to push her feelings for Karma away.

Part 2
After being locked up for drug dealing, Karma's family is having financial problems and have to rent their house to Felix (Parker Mack), the new guy in school. Liam promised his dad to give up art and started an internship at his family's company, along with Zita (Chloe Bridges), whom he befriends. After Shane outing him as gay, Duke and him fight and they break up. Amy tries to spend more time with her dad while she's still unsure about her feelings for Karma.

Cast and characters

Main cast

 Katie Stevens as Karma Ashcroft
 Rita Volk as Amy Raudenfeld
 Gregg Sulkin as Liam Booker
 Michael Willett as Shane Harvey
 Bailey De Young as Lauren Cooper

Recurring cast
 Rebecca McFarland as Farrah
 Senta Moses as Penelope Bevier
 Erick Lopez as Tommy Ortega
 Courtney Kato as Leila
 Breezy Eslin as Elizabeth
 Anthony Palacios as Pablo
 Amy Farrington as Molly
 Lance Barber as Lucas
 Dan Gauthier as Bruce Cooper
 Courtney Henggeler as Robin
 August Roads as Oliver Walsh
 Yvette Monreal as Reagan
 Keith Powers as Anthony "Theo"
 Bruce Thomas as Max Booker
 Skyler Maxon as Duke Lewis Jr.
 Chloe Bridges as Zita Cruz
 Bernard Curry as George Turner
 Parker Mack as Felix Turner
 Ed Quinn as Hank
 Lindsey Shaw as Sasha Harvey

Guest star
 Sofia Carson as Soleil
 Austin Lyon as Victor
 Laverne Cox as Margot
 Fifth Harmony as a girl group
 Mary Lambert as herself

Production
On June 9, 2014, the series was picked up for a ten-episode second season, which was later expanded to a twenty-episode season. The episodes for 2A were broadcast on the time slot of Tuesdays from 10:30 PM–11:00 PM EST, while the 2B ones were broadcast on the time slot of Mondays from 9:30 PM–10:00 PM EST.

Episodes

Reception

Reviews
The Young Folks had this to say about season 2A: "Faking It's sophomore season starts off with a bang, an emotional rollercoaster that, while not as big as the season finale's final minutes, has the perfect backdrop to lead up to some jaw-dropping events in the future." While "We Got This Covered" said this about season 2B: "Faking It is still a humorous nexus of forward-thinking, silver-tongued teenagers, but the second half of season two also cements the show as something else: a damn good ensemble sitcom."

Awards and nominations

Home media
The show is available for digital download on iTunes and Amazon.com. Although there hasn't been a wide DVD/BD release, on July 30, 2015 "Season 2, Part 1" was made available for purchase in DVD (Region 1) format per Manufactured on Demand (MOD) on Amazon.com The second part was released on DVD, in the same circumstances as Part 1, on June 15, 2016.

References

External links

2014 American television seasons
2015 American television seasons